The Vehbi Emre Tournament 2012, was a wrestling event held in Istanbul, Turkey between 28 and 29 January 2012. This tournament was held as 32th. It was held as the first of the ranking series Golden Grand Prix of 2012.

This international tournament includes competition men's Greco-Roman wrestling. This ranking tournament was held in honor of Turkish Wrestler and manager Vehbi Emre.

Medal table

Greco-Roman

Participating nations

References 

Vehbi Emre
Vehbi Emre and Hamit Kaplan
Sports competitions in Istanbul
International wrestling competitions hosted by Turkey
Vehbi Emre & Hamit Kaplan Tournament